The Scotiabank Aquatics Center is an aquatics center built for the 2011 Pan American Games in the municipality of Zapopan, near Guadalajara, Mexico.  It was opened June 22, 2011, built at a cost of $USD31.7m (380 million pesos).   It is the most modern aquatic complex of its kind in Latin America, and considered to be the second best in the world by the Fédération Internationale de Natation. It has a permanent capacity 3,593, but will have a capacity of 5,000 spectators for the Pan American Games.

The outside of the building is shaped like a wave.  It contains two 50m Olympic sized pools and a diving tank.  During the 2011 Pan America Games it will host the swimming, diving, synchronized swimming and water polo.  After the Pan American Games it will used as a high performance training centre,  and for the 2017 World Aquatics Championships.

The center is sponsored by Scotiabank, a Canadian-based bank, which operates in Mexico under the name Scotiabank Inverlat.

See also
2011 Pan American Games

External links
Profile

References

Venues of the 2011 Pan American Games
Sports venues in Jalisco
2011 establishments in Mexico